Kaliakkavilai is a town panchayat in Kanyakumari district in the Indian state of Tamil Nadu, close to the Tamil Nadu-Kerala border. It lies on the Kochi-Thiruvananthapuram-Kanyakumari National highway 47.

Demographics
 India census, Kaliakkavilai had a population of 13,307. Males constitute 49% of the population and females 51%. Kaliakkavilai has an average literacy rate of 77%, higher than the national average of 59.5%: male literacy is 81%, and female literacy is 74%. In Kaliakkavilai, 11% of the population is under 6 years of age.

persons.

References

Cities and towns in Kanyakumari district